is a Japanese athlete competing in long-distance events. Representing Japan at the 2019 World Athletics Championships, she placed seventh in the women's marathon.

References

External links

1994 births
Living people
Japanese female marathon runners
Japanese female long-distance runners
World Athletics Championships athletes for Japan
20th-century Japanese women
21st-century Japanese women